is a Japanese animation studio notable for producing the anime series Renkin 3-kyū Magical? Pokān and Dōjin Work.

Produced series
Renkin 3-kyū Magical? Pokān
Series run: April 4, 2006 — June 20, 2006
Episodes: 12 x 24 minutes

Dōjin Work
Series run: July 4, 2007 — September 19, 2007
Episodes: 12 x 24 minutes

R-15
Episode 9 only

External links

Japanese animation studios